The Jupiter trojans, commonly called trojan asteroids or simply trojans, are a large group of asteroids that share the planet Jupiter's orbit around the Sun. Jupiter trojans are distributed in two elongated, curved regions around these Lagrangian points with an average semi-major axis of about 5.2 AU.

The first Jupiter trojan discovered, 588 Achilles, was spotted in 1906 by German astronomer Max Wolf. More than 9,800 Jupiter trojans have been found . By convention, they are each named from Greek mythology after a figure of the Trojan War, hence the name "trojan". Like main-belt asteroids, Jupiter trojans form families.

, many Jupiter trojans showed to observational instruments as dark bodies with reddish, featureless spectra. No firm evidence of the presence of water, or any other specific compound on their surface has been obtained, but it is thought that they are coated in tholins, organic polymers formed by the Sun's radiation. The Jupiter trojans' densities (as measured by studying binaries or rotational lightcurves) vary from 0.8 to 2.5 g·cm−3. Jupiter trojans are thought to have been captured into their orbits during the early stages of the Solar System's formation or slightly later, during the migration of giant planets.

The term "Trojan Asteroid" specifically refers to the asteroids co-orbital with Jupiter, but the general term "trojan" is sometimes more generally applied to other small Solar System bodies with similar relationships to larger bodies: Mars trojans, Neptune trojans, Uranus trojans and Earth trojans are known to exist.  The term "Trojan asteroid" is normally understood to specifically mean the Jupiter trojans because the first Trojans were discovered near Jupiter's orbit and Jupiter currently has by far the most known Trojans.

Observational history 

In 1772, Italian-born mathematician Joseph-Louis Lagrange, in studying the restricted three-body problem, predicted that a small body sharing an orbit with a planet but lying 60° ahead or behind it will be trapped near these points. The trapped body will librate slowly around the point of equilibrium in a tadpole or horseshoe orbit. The first asteroids trapped in Lagrange points were observed more than a century after Lagrange's hypothesis. Those associated with Jupiter were the first to be discovered.

E. E. Barnard made the first recorded observation of a trojan,  (identified as A904 RD at the time), in 1904, but neither he nor others appreciated its significance at the time. Barnard believed he had seen the recently discovered Saturnian satellite Phoebe, which was only two arc-minutes away in the sky at the time, or possibly an asteroid. The object's identity was not understood until its orbit was calculated in 1999.

The first accepted discovery of a trojan occurred in February 1906, when astronomer Max Wolf of Heidelberg-Königstuhl State Observatory discovered an asteroid at the  Lagrangian point of the Sun–Jupiter system, later named 588 Achilles. In 1906–1907 two more Jupiter trojans were found by fellow German astronomer August Kopff (624 Hektor and 617 Patroclus). Hektor, like Achilles, belonged to the  swarm ("ahead" of the planet in its orbit), whereas Patroclus was the first asteroid known to reside at the  Lagrangian point ("behind" the planet). By 1938, 11 Jupiter trojans had been detected. This number increased to 14 only in 1961.

Nomenclature 
The custom of naming all asteroids in Jupiter's  and  points after famous heroes of the Trojan War was suggested by Johann Palisa of Vienna, who was the first to accurately calculate their orbits.

Asteroids in the leading orbit are named after Greek heroes (the "Greek node or camp" or "Achilles group"), and those at the trailing orbit are named after the heroes of Troy (the "Trojan node or camp"). The asteroids 617 Patroclus and 624 Hektor were named before the Greece/Troy rule was devised, resulting in a "Greek spy", Patroclus, in the Trojan node and a "Trojan spy", Hector, in the Greek node.

Numbers and mass 

Estimates of the total number of Jupiter trojans are based on deep surveys of limited areas of the sky. The  swarm is believed to hold between 160,000 and 240,000 asteroids with diameters larger than 2 km and about 600,000 with diameters larger than 1 km. If the  swarm contains a comparable number of objects, there are more than  Jupiter trojans 1 km in size or larger. For the objects brighter than absolute magnitude 9.0 the population is probably complete. These numbers are similar to that of comparable asteroids in the asteroid belt. The total mass of the Jupiter trojans is estimated at 0.0001 of the mass of Earth or one-fifth of the mass of the asteroid belt.

Two more recent studies indicate that the above numbers may overestimate the number of Jupiter trojans by several-fold. This overestimate is caused by (1) the assumption that all Jupiter trojans have a low albedo of about 0.04, whereas small bodies may have an average albedo as high as 0.12; (2) an incorrect assumption about the distribution of Jupiter trojans in the sky. These numbers would be reduced by a factor of 2 if small Jupiter trojans are more reflective than large ones.

Because the brightest Jupiter trojans show little variation in numbers between the two populations, this disparity is probably due to observational bias. Some models indicate that the  swarm may be slightly more stable than the  swarm.

The largest Jupiter trojan is 624 Hektor, which has a mean diameter of 203 ± 3.6 km. There are few large Jupiter trojans in comparison to the overall population. With decreasing size, the number of Jupiter trojans grows very quickly down to 84 km, much more so than in the asteroid belt. A diameter of 84 km corresponds to an absolute magnitude of 9.5, assuming an albedo of 0.04. Within the 4.4–40 km range the Jupiter trojans' size distribution resembles that of the main-belt asteroids. Nothing is known about the masses of the smaller Jupiter trojans. The size distribution suggests that the smaller Trojans may be the products of collisions by larger Jupiter trojans.

Orbits 

Jupiter trojans have orbits with radii between 5.05 and 5.35 AU (the mean semi-major axis is 5.2 ± 0.15 AU), and are distributed throughout elongated, curved regions around the two Lagrangian points; each swarm stretches for about 26° along the orbit of Jupiter, amounting to a total distance of about 2.5 AU. The width of the swarms approximately equals two Hill's radii, which in the case of Jupiter amounts to about 0.6 AU. Many of Jupiter trojans have large orbital inclinations relative to Jupiter's orbital plane—up to 40°.

Jupiter trojans do not maintain a fixed separation from Jupiter. They slowly librate around their respective equilibrium points, periodically moving closer to Jupiter or farther from it. Jupiter trojans generally follow paths called tadpole orbits around the Lagrangian points; the average period of their libration is about 150 years. The amplitude of the libration (along the Jovian orbit) varies from 0.6° to 88°, with the average being about 33°. Simulations show that Jupiter trojans can follow even more complicated trajectories when moving from one Lagrangian point to another—these are called horseshoe orbits (currently no Jupiter Trojan with such an orbit is known, though one is known for Neptune).

Dynamical families and binaries 
Discerning dynamical families within the Jupiter trojan population is more difficult than it is in the asteroid belt, because the Jupiter trojans are locked within a far narrower range of possible positions. This means that clusters tend to overlap and merge with the overall swarm. By 2003 roughly a dozen dynamical families were identified. Jupiter-trojan families are much smaller in size than families in the asteroid belt; the largest identified family, the Menelaus group, consists of only eight members.

In 2001, 617 Patroclus was the first Jupiter trojan to be identified as a binary asteroid. The binary's orbit is extremely close, at 650 km, compared to 35,000 km for the primary's Hill sphere. The largest Jupiter trojan—624 Hektor— is probably a contact binary with a moonlet.

Physical properties 

Jupiter trojans are dark bodies of irregular shape. Their geometric albedos generally vary between 3 and 10%. The average value is 0.056 ± 0.003 for the objects larger than 57 km, and 0.121 ± 0.003 (R-band) for those smaller than 25 km. The asteroid 4709 Ennomos has the highest albedo (0.18) of all known Jupiter trojans. Little is known about the masses, chemical composition, rotation or other physical properties of the Jupiter trojans.

Rotation 
The rotational properties of Jupiter trojans are not well known. Analysis of the rotational light curves of 72 Jupiter trojans gave an average rotational period of about 11.2 hours, whereas the average period of the control sample of asteroids in the asteroid belt was 10.6 hours. The distribution of the rotational periods of Jupiter trojans appeared to be well approximated by a Maxwellian function, whereas the distribution for main-belt asteroids was found to be non-Maxwellian, with a deficit of periods in the range 8–10 hours. The Maxwellian distribution of the rotational periods of Jupiter trojans may indicate that they have undergone a stronger collisional evolution compared to the asteroid belt.

In 2008 a team from Calvin College examined the light curves of a debiased sample of ten Jupiter trojans, and found a median spin period of 18.9 hours. This value was significantly higher than that for main-belt asteroids of similar size (11.5 hours). The difference could mean that the Jupiter trojans possess a lower average density, which may imply that they formed in the Kuiper belt (see below).

Composition 
Spectroscopically, the Jupiter trojans mostly are D-type asteroids, which predominate in the outer regions of the asteroid belt. A small number are classified as P or C-type asteroids. Their spectra are red (meaning that they reflect more light at longer wavelengths) or neutral and featureless. No firm evidence of water, organics or other chemical compounds has been obtained . 4709 Ennomos has an albedo slightly higher than the Jupiter-trojan average, which may indicate the presence of water ice. Some other Jupiter Trojans, such as 911 Agamemnon and 617 Patroclus, have shown very weak absorptions at 1.7 and 2.3 μm, which might indicate the presence of organics. The Jupiter trojans' spectra are similar to those of the irregular moons of Jupiter and, to a certain extent, comet nuclei, though Jupiter trojans are spectrally very different from the redder Kuiper belt objects. A Jupiter trojan's spectrum can be matched to a mixture of water ice, a large amount of carbon-rich material (charcoal), and possibly magnesium-rich silicates. The composition of the Jupiter trojan population appears to be markedly uniform, with little or no differentiation between the two swarms.

A team from the Keck Observatory in Hawaii announced in 2006 that it had measured the density of the binary Jupiter trojan 617 Patroclus as being less than that of water ice (0.8 g/cm3), suggesting that the pair, and possibly many other Trojan objects, more closely resemble comets or Kuiper belt objects in composition—water ice with a layer of dust—than they do the main-belt asteroids. Countering this argument, the density of Hektor as determined from its rotational lightcurve (2.480 g/cm3) is significantly higher than that of 617 Patroclus. Such a difference in densities suggests that density may not be a good indicator of asteroid origin.

Origin and evolution 

Two main theories have emerged to explain the formation and evolution of the Jupiter trojans. The first suggests that the Jupiter trojans formed in the same part of the Solar System as Jupiter and entered their orbits while it was forming. The last stage of Jupiter's formation involved runaway growth of its mass through the accretion of large amounts of hydrogen and helium from the protoplanetary disk; during this growth, which lasted for only about 10,000 years, the mass of Jupiter increased by a factor of ten. The planetesimals that had approximately the same orbits as Jupiter were caught by the increased gravity of the planet. The capture mechanism was very efficient—about 50% of all remaining planetesimals were trapped. This hypothesis has two major problems: the number of trapped bodies exceeds the observed population of Jupiter trojans by four orders of magnitude, and the present Jupiter trojan asteroids have larger orbital inclinations than are predicted by the capture model. Simulations of this scenario show that such a mode of formation also would inhibit the creation of similar trojans for Saturn, and this has been borne out by observation: to date no trojans have been found near Saturn. In a variation of this theory Jupiter captures trojans during its initial growth then migrates as it continues to grow. During Jupiter's migration the orbits of objects in horseshoe orbits are distorted causing the L4 side of these orbits to be over occupied. As a result, an excess of trojans is trapped on the L4 side when the horseshoe orbits shift to tadpole orbits as Jupiter grows. This model also leaves the Jupiter trojan population 3–4 orders of magnitude too large.

The second theory proposes that the Jupiter trojans were captured during the migration of the giant planets described in the Nice model. In the Nice model the orbits of the giant planets became unstable  years after the Solar System's formation when Jupiter and Saturn crossed their 1:2 mean-motion resonance. Encounters between planets resulted in Uranus and Neptune being scattered outward into the primordial Kuiper belt, disrupting it and throwing millions of objects inward. When Jupiter and Saturn were near their 1:2 resonance the orbits of pre-existing Jupiter trojans became unstable during a secondary resonance with Jupiter and Saturn. This occurred when the period of the trojans' libration about their Lagrangian point had a 3:1 ratio to the period at which the position where Jupiter passes Saturn circulated relative to its perihelion. This process was also reversible allowing a fraction of the numerous objects scattered inward by Uranus and Neptune to enter this region and be captured as Jupiter's and Saturn's orbits separated. These new trojans had a wide range of inclinations, the result of multiple encounters with the giant planets before being captured. This process can also occur later when Jupiter and Saturn cross weaker resonances.

In a revised version of the Nice model Jupiter trojans are captured when Jupiter encounters an ice giant during the instability. In this version of the Nice model one of the ice giants (Uranus, Neptune, or a lost fifth planet) is scattered inward onto a Jupiter-crossing orbit and is scattered outward by Jupiter causing the orbits of Jupiter and Saturn to quickly separate. When Jupiter's semi-major axis jumps during these encounters existing Jupiter trojans can escape and new objects with semi-major axes similar to Jupiter's new semi-major axis are captured. Following its last encounter the ice giant can pass through one of the libration points and perturb their orbits leaving this libration point depleted relative to the other. After the encounters end some of these Jupiter trojans are lost and others captured when Jupiter and Saturn are near weak mean motion resonances such as the 3:7 resonance via the mechanism of the original Nice model.

The long-term future of the Jupiter trojans is open to question, because multiple weak resonances with Jupiter and Saturn cause them to behave chaotically over time. Collisional shattering slowly depletes the Jupiter trojan population as fragments are ejected. Ejected Jupiter trojans could become temporary satellites of Jupiter or Jupiter-family comets. Simulations show that the orbits of up to 17% of Jupiter trojans are unstable over the age of the Solar System. Levison et al. believe that roughly 200 ejected Jupiter trojans greater than 1 km in diameter might be travelling the Solar System, with a few possibly on Earth-crossing orbits. Some of the escaped Jupiter trojans may become Jupiter-family comets as they approach the Sun and their surface ice begins evaporating.

Exploration 
On 4 January 2017 NASA announced that Lucy was selected as one of their next two Discovery Program missions. Lucy is set to explore seven Jupiter trojans. It launched on October 16, 2021, and will arrive at the  Trojan cloud in 2027 after two Earth gravity assists and a fly-by of a main-belt asteroid. It will then return to the vicinity of Earth for another gravity assist to take it to Jupiter's  Trojan cloud where it will visit 617 Patroclus.

See also 

 Comet Shoemaker–Levy 9
 List of Jupiter trojans (Greek camp)
 List of Jupiter trojans (Trojan camp)
 List of Jupiter-crossing minor planets
 List of objects at Lagrangian points

Notes

References

External links 

 
 
 
 NASA's WISE Colors in Unknowns on Jupiter Asteroids (NASA 2012-322 : 15 October 2012)
 
 3D Gravity Simulation of the Ten Largest Jupiter Trojan Asteroids 

 
5